The Vietnam national under-22 and Olympic football team is the under-22 football team representing Vietnam at the Southeast Asian Games, AFC U-23 Championship qualifiers. It is controlled by the Vietnam Football Federation. The team established in 2016.

Competitive records

SEA Games
In 2017, 2019 and 2023 football at the Southeast Asian Games uses Under-22 squads.

Recent results and Forthcoming Fixtures

2019

Current squad 
On 28 February, 41 players were called up for training camp in Hanoi to prepare for Sea Games 2023. The squad was reduced to 28 players on 7 March and was extended to 37 players on 11 March 2023, with 9 additions from Vietnam U20.

Coaching staff

See also
 Football in Vietnam
 Vietnam Football Federation
 Vietnam national football team
 Vietnam national under-23 football team
 Vietnam national under-21 football team
 Vietnam national under-19 football team
 Vietnam national under-16 football team
 Vietnam national futsal team
 Vietnam national beach soccer team
 VFF Cup

References

External links
  

U22
Asian national under-23 association football teams